Saint William may refer to:

Saints
 Saint William of Gellone (755–812 or 814), second Count of Toulouse
 Saint William of Volpiano (962 - 1031), monastic reformer and architect
 Saint William Firmatus (1026 - 1103), hermit
 Saint William of Montevergine (d. 1142), abbot
 Saint William of Norwich (c.1132 – 1144)
 Saint William of York (d. 1154), Archbishop
 Saint William of Maleval or Saint William the Great (d. 1157), hermit
 Saint William of Perth, the patron saint of adopted children, killed by his adoptive son c. 1201
 Saint William of Æbelholt (c. 1125 - 1203), also known as William of Paris or William of the Paraclete, French ecclesiastic active in Denmark
 Saint William of Donjeon (c.1155 – 1209), also known as William of Bourges, William the Confessor or William Berroyer, Archbishop of Bourges

See also
 Saint-Guillaume (disambiguation) - French equivalent